Burnett Edward Gholston (July 28, 1888 – November 19 or 20, 1954) was an American baseball umpire in the Negro leagues. He umpired for 20 years, from 1923 to 1943, in both the first and second Negro National League, and the East-West League.


Early life and career
Gholston attended Hampton Institute from 1909 to 1911. During World War I, he served in the 24th Infantry Division and 10th Infantry Regiment of the United States Army, reaching the rank of first sergeant.

References

1888 births
1954 deaths
Negro league baseball
Baseball umpires
20th-century American people
Hampton University alumni
African Americans in World War I
20th-century African-American sportspeople
United States Army personnel of World War I
African-American United States Army personnel